The 1992 Invercargill mayoral election was held on 10 October 1992, as part of the 1992 New Zealand local elections, and was conducted under the First Past the Post system.

Incumbent mayor Eve Poole was re-elected with a reduced majority in a tight three-way race with deputy mayor Bruce Pagan and councillor Mirek Cvigr.

Poole died two months later, triggering a by-election in March 1993.

Results
The following table gives the election results:

References

1992 elections in New Zealand
Mayoral elections in Invercargill
October 1992 events in New Zealand